Aloe cryptopoda,  is a species of flowering plant in the Asphodelaceae family. It is found in S.E. Tanzania to Botswana.

References

External links
 
 

cryptopoda
Taxa named by John Gilbert Baker